Robert Maxwell (sometimes credited as Bob Maxwell) was an American cinematographer known for his work on B movies, pornography, and exploitation films of the 1960s and 1970s. His best-known credits include Melvin Van Peebles' Sweet Sweetback's Badasssss Song and Don't Play Us Cheap.

Selected filmography 

 Candy Stripers (1978)
 Telefantasy (1978)
 The Only Way to Spy (1978)
 The Zebra Force (1976)
 Mafia Girls (1975)
 Paesano: A Voice in the Night (1975)
 The Centerfold Girls (1974)
 Tower of Love (1974)
 Don't Play Us Cheap (1973)
 The Severed Arm (1973)
 The Candy Snatchers (1973)
 House of Terror (1973)
 Did Baby Shoot Her Sugardaddy? (1972)
 Strangers (1972)
 The Blue Hour (1971)
 Point of Terror (1971)
 Sweet Sweetback's Baadasssss Song (1971)
 Wanderlove (1970)
 Up Your Teddy Bear (1970)
 Blood Mania (1970)
 The Bang Bang Gang (1970)
 The Zodiac Couples (1970)
 Love Me Like I Do (1970)
 Song of the Loon (1970)
 The Scavengers (1969)
 The Ramrodder (1969)
 College Girls (1968)
 The Astro-Zombies (1968)
 Girl in Gold Boots (1968)

References 

American cinematographers
1923 births
1978 deaths